The Calgary Marathon is an annual race held in Calgary, Alberta, Canada. The marathon is certified by Athletics Canada and is a registered AIMS Marathon, and therefore can be used as a qualifying marathon race.

In late 2013, it was announced that the Calgary Marathon would also host a one-time only 50 kilometre ultramarathon in 2014 to commemorate the 50th anniversary of the event. All finishers in the 50k event will receive a commemorative beer glass from the title sponsor of the race, Wild Rose Brewery. The Calgary Marathon has announced that it will host a 150K race in 2017 as part of race weekend to celebrate Canada's 150th anniversary.

Past results

Key: 

*In 1972 two races were held.

See also
 List of marathon races in North America

References

External links
Calgary Marathon

Marathons in Canada
Recurring sporting events established in 1963
Annual sporting events in Canada
Sport in Calgary